Hykmete Bajrami is a politician from Kosovo. She has been the Minister of Finance of Kosovo from June 2020. She was the Minister of Trade and Industry in the Government of Isa Mustafa of the Republic of Kosovo.

Background
Bajrami is a professor of marketing related topics at the University of Pristina. She completed her master's degree at  Staffordshire University in the UK, and did her PhD studies at the University of Pristina. She was appointed to be Minister of Trade and Industry in the government created by PDK and LDK with the prime minister Isa Mustafa from the LDK.

Previous
Hykmete Bajrami was a member of Parliament when LDK was in opposition. She was known to be one of the main opponents of Hashim Thaçi government as well as one of the main opponents of having a strong opposition to form coalition with the PDK.

References

Living people
Finance ministers of Kosovo
University of Pristina alumni
Alumni of Staffordshire University
Year of birth missing (living people)
Government ministers of Kosovo
Democratic League of Kosovo politicians
Female finance ministers